The 2008 Women's Hockey South American Championship was the second edition of the South American Championship. It was held between 30 March and 6 April 2008 in Montevideo, Uruguay.

Argentina won the tournament for the second time, defeating Chile 5–1 in the final. Uruguay won the bronze medal after defeating Brazil 2–0 in the third place match.

Umpires
The following umpires were appointed by the International Hockey Federation to officiate the tournament:

 Amy Hassick (USA)
 Cinthia Mellí (ARG)
 Beatriz Mongelos (PAR)
 Maritza Pérez (URU)
 Mariana Reydo (ARG)
 Claudia Videla (CHL)

Results

Preliminary round

Fixtures

Classification round

Fifth and sixth place

Third and fourth place

Final

Statistics

Final standings
Note: as Argentina qualified for the 2009 Pan American Cup as defending champions, the qualification quota was moved to second placed team, Chile.

Goalscorers

References

External links
Pan American Hockey Federation

South American Championship
International women's field hockey competitions hosted by Uruguay
Women's Hockey South American Championship
Sports competitions in Montevideo
Women's South American Hockey Championship
Women's Hockey South American Championship
Women's Hockey South American Championship